The second USS Josephine (SP-1243) was a United States Navy patrol vessel in commission from 1917 to 1918.

Josephine was built as a civilian motor yacht of the same name in 1905 by the Peter Grutti Shipyards at New Orleans, Louisiana. The U.S. Navy acquired her at New Orleans from her owners, Lee H. Tate et al. of St. Louis, Missouri, on 27 October 1917 for World War I service as a patrol vessel. She was commissioned as USS Josephine (SP-1243) on 5 November 1917.

Attached to the 8th Naval District and based at Burrwood, Louisiana, Josephine patrolled the Southwest Pass, the lower Mississippi River, and the Gulf of Mexico on the section patrol for the remainder of World War I.

Josephine was decommissioned on 6 December 1918 and was returned to Tate and his co-owners.

Josephine should not be confused with two other patrol vessels, USS Josephine (SP-913) and USS Josephine (SP-3295), which also were in commission in the U.S. Navy during World War I.

References

Department of the Navy: Navy History and Heritage Command: Online Library of Selected Images: Civilian Ships: Josephine (Motor Yacht, 1905); Later USS Josephine (SP-1243), 1917-1918
NavSource Online: Section Patrol Craft Photo Archive: Josephine (SP 1243)

Patrol vessels of the United States Navy
World War I patrol vessels of the United States
Individual yachts
Ships built in New Orleans
1905 ships